The Deputy Assistant Secretary of the Navy for C4I and Space Programs (DASN (C4I/Space)) is a civilian office of the United States Department of the Navy.  The DASN (C4I/Space) reports to the Assistant Secretary of the Navy for Research, Development and Acquisition, and serves as the principal adviser to the assistant secretary on issues involving command, control, communications, computers, intelligence and space programs and policy.

DASN C4I/SPACE space works closely with Space and Naval Warfare Systems Command (SPAWAR); PEO (C4I); PEO (Space Systems); PEO (Enterprise Information Systems); and other systems commands engaging in C4I.

The current DASN (C4I/Space) is Ms. Jane Rathbun.

References

External links
 DASN (C4I/Space) website

Office of the Secretary of the Navy